Leptaxis furva is a species of air-breathing land snail, a terrestrial pulmonate gastropod mollusk in the family Helicidae, the typical snails. This species is endemic to Madeira, Portugal.

References

Endemic fauna of Madeira
Molluscs of Europe
Leptaxis
Taxonomy articles created by Polbot